Paulino Ortiz Casanova (December 21, 1941 – August 12, 2017) was a Cuban professional baseball player. He played as a catcher in Major League Baseball from 1965 to 1974 for the Washington Senators and Atlanta Braves.

Minor league career
Paul Casanova began his professional baseball career on January 1,  when he was signed as a free agent by the Cleveland Indians. After playing ten minor league games, he was released by the Indians. Casanova was picked back up by the Indians in December, only to be released again in April 1961. During the 1961 season, he played for the Indianapolis Clowns, a former Negro league team which was now competing as an independent. His third short minor league stint was with the Chicago Cubs, who signed him on September 21,  and released him on April 26,  after he had played two minor league games. On October 5 of that year, Casanova was signed by the Washington Senators, and his professional baseball career would truly begin the following season. He played 94 games in the minors during the 1963 season. He continued to play in the New York–Penn League during the 1964 season and played 120 games, finishing with 19 home runs and a .325 batting average. He spent the 1965 season playing for the Burlington Senators, and was called up to the major league roster in September, starting his major league career.

Major league career
Casanova began his major league career on September 18, stepping up to bat twice in a losing effort to the Minnesota Twins – the team which had relocated from Washington less than five years earlier, paving the way for the expansion Senators. He played four more games that season. Casanova's first full season came in 1966, when he had career highs of 13 home runs and 5 triples. The 1967 season was Casanova's best, as he earned his only All-Star bid, though he did not play in the game. He played 141 games, had a fielding percentage of .984, and was tied for 21st in the American League's MVP voting. Casanova was also the starting catcher for a night game against the Chicago White Sox on June 12, . He caught the whole night, and although he only got one hit in nine at bats, it came in the bottom of the 22nd inning, driving in the winning run. The game, which went 6 hours and 38 minutes, remains the longest night game in MLB history. The following season was a disappointment, as Casanova played in only 96 games and had a batting average of only .196.

Casanova continued to earn fielding percentages of over .985, but he struggled at the plate for three more seasons. The franchise was moved to the Dallas–Fort Worth metroplex and rebranded as the Texas Rangers, but Casanova would not be part of the transition as he was traded to the Atlanta Braves for Hal King at the Winter Meetings on December 2, 1971. He played for three seasons on the Braves, serving primarily as a backup. He played behind Earl Williams for the 1972 season, then split time with Johnny Oates in 1973. After playing in only 42 games during the 1974 season, Casanova was released on March 28, .

As a Brave, Casanova caught Phil Niekro's no-hitter on August 5, 1973.

Casanova died in 2017 in Miami, Florida at 75 of cardiorespiratory complications.

References

External links

Paul Casanova at SABR (Baseball BioProject)
Paul Casanova at  Baseball Almanac
Paul Casanova at Pura Pelota (Venezuelan Professional Baseball League)

1941 births
2017 deaths
Almendares (baseball) players
American League All-Stars
Atlanta Braves players
Buffalo Bisons (minor league) players
Burlington Senators players
Cuban emigrants to the United States
Florida Instructional League Senators players
Geneva Senators players
Gold Coast Suns (baseball) players
Indianapolis Clowns players
Major League Baseball catchers
Major League Baseball players from Cuba
Cuban expatriate baseball players in the United States
Minor league baseball coaches
Minot Mallards players
People from Colón, Cuba
San Antonio Missions players
Tiburones de La Guaira players
Cuban expatriate baseball players in Venezuela
Tigres de Aragua players
Washington Senators (1961–1971) players
York White Roses players
21st-century African-American people